Yosakoi is a unique style of dance that originated in Japan and that is performed at festivals and events all over the country. The first Yosakoi festival was held in 1954 in Kōchi, Japan, on the island of Shikoku. Yosakoi-style dancing has spread throughout much of Japan. The style of dance is highly energetic, combining traditional Japanese dance movements with modern music. The choreographed dances are often performed by large teams. Along with a number of professional yosakoi schools and town dance teams, yosakoi is also a popular event during the sports festivals held by Japanese elementary, junior, and senior high schools. Its participants include men and women of almost all ages – sometimes within a single team.

Costumes and naruko

The costumes used by yosakoi teams vary widely. Happi coats and yukata are the most predominant costumes and can be seen in a wide variety of colors. However, some groups choose costumes that are based on historical attire, popular fashions, or ethnic fashions. Typically, all members of a team wear similar costumes.

One of the defining aspects of yosakoi dance is the use of naruko: small wooden clappers that are held in the hands of each dancer. Naruko were originally used in Kōchi Prefecture to scare birds away from rice fields. The traditional naruko has black and yellow beaters on a wooden body, but most modern yosakoi groups create their own naruko, choosing colors and materials that match their costumes. The use of naruko is required in yosakoi dance, but many groups also use other hand-held instruments or props, such as drums, other percussion instruments, flags, batons, and floats.

Yosakoi Naruko Dancing

The official yosakoi dance is based on a song called "Yosakoi Naruko Dancing", written by Takemasa Eisaku. This song was created by combining elements of three songs: "Yosakoi-bushi" ("yosakoi melody"), "Yocchore" (a children's song), and "Jinma-mo" (a folk song of Kōchi Prefecture). The original competition in Kōchi requires that each team's music include some part of this original music. Competitions and festivals in other areas may not have this requirement (thus allowing teams to compose their own music), or may require that elements of different local folk songs are worked into the dance routines. Takemasa has given the copyright on "Yosakoi Naruko Dancing" to the public.

"Yosakoi Naruko Dance" by Takemasa Eisaku, English translation from Youtube Takeaki Mitsunaga

ヨッチョレヨ ヨッチョレヨ / Yotchoreyo Yotchoreyo

ヨッチョレ ヨッチョレ ヨッチョレヨ / Yotchore Yotchore Yotchoreyo

ヨッチョレ ヨッチョレ ヨッチョレヨ / Yotchore Yotchore Yotchoreyo

高知の城下へ来てみいや（ソレ）/ Come to near Kochi castle

じんまも ばんばも よう踊る / Grandfather and grandmother are dancing well

鳴子両手に よう踊る よう踊る / Dancing well holding Naruko in hands

土佐のー（ヨイヤサノ サノ サノ）

高知の はりまや橋で（ヨイヤサノ サノ サノ）/ Near the Harimaya bridge in Kochi known as Tosa

坊さん かんざし買うをみた（ソレ）/  A monk is buying a hairpin

よさこい よさこい（ホイ ホイ）/ Yosakoi Yosakoi hoi hoi

二、（※くり返し）/ Verse 2

御畳瀬（ヨイヤサノ サノ サノ）

見せましょ 浦戸を開けて（ヨイヤサノ サノ サノ）/ Lets show Mimase. By opening Urato

月の名所は 桂浜（ソレ）/ The famous location to see the moon is Katsurahama

よさこい よさこい（ホイ ホイ）/ Yosakoi Yosakoi hoi hoi

三、（※くり返し）

土佐のー（ヨイヤサノ サノ サノ）

名物 さんごに 鯨（ヨイヤサノ サノ サノ）

紙に 生糸に かつお節（ソレ）

よさこい よさこい（ホイ ホイ）

四、（※くり返し）

言うたち（ヨイヤサノ サノ サノ）

いかんちや おらんくの 池にゃ（ヨイヤサノ サノ サノ）

潮吹く 魚が 泳ぎよる（ソレ）

よさこい よさこい（ホイ ホイ）

Yosakoi Matsuri

Yosakoi Matsuri ("yosakoi festival") is a festival in the city of Kōchi, Japan. The original yosakoi festival, it has taken place every August since 1954, except 2020 due to Covid 19. In this festival, teams of dancers and floats crowd to dance the yosakoi naruko dance together. The number of participants has increased yearly: as of 2005 over 10,000 dancers participate in this competition every year.

The rules of the Kōchi yosakoi competition are as follows:
Participants must use the naruko clappers in the dance
Any musical arrangement is acceptable, but the music must contain at least some part of Takemasa's original "Yosakoi Naruko Dancing" song
Teams are limited to 150 participants

Growth

Since its introduction in 1954, yosakoi has become popular throughout the country of Japan. Yosakoi-Soran festivals are now held all over Japan throughout the year. They vary in size from small villages hosting a few teams of dancers in conjunction with another annual festival, to large cities like Sendai, which hosts the Michinoku Yosakoi Festival, the third largest festival in Japan.

As of 2005, there were yosakoi festivals and competitions in over 200 locations.
In Tokyo, the Harajuku Omotesando Genki Matsuri Super Yosakoi is a two-day yosakoi festival that takes place in five locations in Harajuku and Yoyogi Park. This festival has occurred annually since 2001.
The Sakado, Saitama Yosakoi started in 2001 with 67 teams and 4600 participants. The 11th festival was in 2011.
Sapporo, Hokkaido held its inaugural Yosakoi Sōran Festival in 1992. The 16th festival began on June 6, 2007, in Odori Park and other venues.
Sasebo, Nagasaki hosts the largest Yosakoi festival on Kyushu at the end of every October.
Yosakoi has appeared on the television drama .
In Surabaya, there is an annual Yosakoi competition. In 2007, the prize was presented by the mayor of Kōchi, Seiya Okazaki.
In Sekolah Alam Shah, Putrajaya, Malaysia, during the Form 1 Cultural Night one of six sport houses will perform yosakoi.

An example of yosakoi dancing can be seen in the feature film The Harimaya Bridge, which was filmed in Kōchi Prefecture. The 2011 manga series, Hanayamata, which received an anime adaptation in July 2014, also focuses on yosakoi.

Internationally 
Yosakoi is performed in Penang, Malaysia every year in March in the middle of UNESCO Heritage City.  It's organised by local enthusiasts called the Pink Hibiscus Yosakoi Dancers together with the Penang City Council, as well as in Accra, Ghana as an annual celebration to strengthen ties between Japan and Ghana.

In Vietnam, yosakoi is performed annually in Japan Sakura Matsuri which is usually held in April in Hanoi by Japan Foundation Vietnam (JPF) to introduce Japanese culture. This festival showed over 10 enthusiastic Yosakoi teams of Vietnam and guest teams from Japan. Yosakoi also appears in anime-manga-cosplay events in large cities such as Hanoi, Ho Chi Minh City and Haiphong. Up to now, there are total 4 Vietnamese yosakoi teams participating in Harajuku Omotesando Super Yosakoi Festival, including Hanoi Sennen Yosakoi Team, Nakama Yosakoi Team, Hanuyo and Nui Truc Sakura Yosakoi Team.

There are also yosakoi teams at universities outside Japan, such as UC Berkeley, Kansas State University., Minnesota State University Moorhead, and in New York City  In Canada, a team called Sakuramai performs locally at cultural events and fairs in Toronto and Montreal.

In Europe, one can learn and dance Yosakoi in the Netherlands, France, Sweden, Germany, or the UK. Formed by the students of Leiden University, the Dutch team Raiden performs it in various Japan-related activities such as the yearly Japanmarkt, anime conventions and cultural events. Its French counterpart was created back in 2010 and perform in several festivals, including the International Fair of Bordeaux. The Swedish team Zyka Yosakoi also performs at local Japan-related events or gatherings. There is also a group in London called Temuzu, which has performed at Japanese events such as HyperJapan.

References

External links

Dancing at Japanese Festivals Accessed October 11, 2005.
The Kōchi Chamber of Commerce and Industry: Yosakoi festival 
Kōchi City: Yosakoi festival 
Yosakoi.tv 
Yosakoi Cultural Association

1954 establishments in Japan
Kōchi
Culture in Kōchi Prefecture
Dances of Japan
Group dances
Articles containing video clips